Am I Still Your Boyfriend? is the sixth album from R&B band, Switch, and their last album. Released in 1984, this album includes new band members Renard Gallo and Gonzales Ozen.

Track listing

Side A
"I'm So Satisfied" (O. Scott)(4:04) 
"Switch It Baby" (J. Ellis)(4:24)
"It's All Up to You" (O. Scott; G. Ozen)(3:57)
"Lovers Don't Hold Back" (G. Williams; R. Hickman)(4:28)
"Keeping Secrets" (O. Scott; G. Ozen) (4:13)

Side B
"Treason" (O. Scott; G. Ozen; A. Hampton)(3:49)
"Am I Still Your Boyfriend" (O. Scott) (4:12)
"Just Can't Pull Away" (J. Ellis) (4:37)
"I Won't Give Up" (O. Scott)(3:43)
"Spend My Life with You" (W.C. Wellman; M. Norfleet; C. Thompson)(4:24)
"Forever My Love" (E. Fluellen)(1:53)

Personnel
Renard Gallo: vocals, percussion
Gonzales Ozen: vocals, percussion
Gregory Williams: keyboards, vocals
Eddie Fluellen: keyboards, trombone, vocals
Jody Sims: drums, percussion, vocals

References

1984 albums
Switch (band) albums
Total Experience Records albums
Albums recorded at Total Experience Recording Studios